Taylor Albert Borradaile (May 15, 1885 – June 25, 1977) was an American chemist and one of four founders, and the first president, of Phi Kappa Tau fraternity.

Biography
Borradaile was born near Camden, Ohio on May 15, 1885 into a prominent local Quaker family. He came to nearby Miami University to study science where he became affiliated with a number of non-fraternity men who were attempting to overcome the political alliances of the campus fraternity men that dominated athletics, student government and other activities. He became the first president of the Non-Fraternity Association founded March 17, 1906. This organization evolved into Phi Kappa Tau fraternity which today has more than 90,000 members in chapters across the United States.

He began his career as a teacher in Tipp City, Ohio and later became involved in chemical sales in Florida, where he also studied law and was admitted to the Florida bar, without attending law school. In later years he was a chemist in government service in Charleston, West Virginia and he retired from the Veterans Administration in Washington, D. C as a chemist. He was an expert on poisons and was regularly hired as an expert witness in trials involving poisons. He received two patents, one for a "process for the separation of magnesium chloride from calcium chloride" and a second for a "method of making ammonium chloride and calcium sulphate".

Borradaile was not involved in the fraternity he founded for the early part of his life and did not attend a national convention of the fraternity until 1951, though he attended every convention from that time until his death.

Borradaile married Anna Laura Reeve with whom he had one child, Joseph Reeve Borradaile. He divorced his first wife in 1936 and married Letha Mandanna Lively the following year. He died in 1977 in Beckley, West Virginia and is interred next to his wife Letha in the Sunset Memorial Park in Beckley.

Legacy
He was the longest living of the fraternity's four founders, outliving William H. Shideler by nearly 20 years. Two of the fraternity's most significant awards are named for him.

References

Anson, Jack L., The Golden Jubilee History of Phi Kappa Tau, Lawhead Press, Athens Ohio: 1957
Ball, Charles T., From Old Main to a New Century: A History of Phi Kappa Tau, Heritage Publishers, Phoenix: 1996

External links

20th-century American chemists
Miami University alumni
Phi Kappa Tau founders
People from Camden, Ohio
People from Beckley, West Virginia
1885 births
1977 deaths
People from Tipp City, Ohio
Florida lawyers
American chemists
People from Charleston, West Virginia
Chemists from West Virginia